Walt Disney's Mousetrap is a Croatian fantasy-comedy film directed by Eduard Tomičić and is based on the writing by Zoran Ferić. It was released in 2003.

Plot
Completely enchanted by Walt Disney and the heroes from his animation world, a nine-year-old boy awaits the visit of his uncle from USA. Young boy's family is also anxious to finally see a man they haven't seen for so long. With the appearance of a gangster-movie hero, the boy's uncle is full of interesting stories adding even more flame to the child's imagination. Everything seems perfect and surreal as if almost they are completely sucked into a world of imagination, up until one horrific event reveals the real truth about uncle's life and deeds.

Cast
 Željko Vukmirica
 Matej Čavlović
 Boris Festini
 Slavko Juraga
 Josip Marotti
 Jadranka Matković
 Marina Nemet
 Marinko Prga
 Predrag Vušović

References

External links
 

2003 films
Croatian-language films
2000s fantasy comedy films
Films based on works by Croatian writers
Films based on short fiction
Croatian fantasy comedy films
2003 comedy films